Orkan ("Hurricane") is the eighth full-length album by Swedish folk metal band Vintersorg. As with the previous two albums, the lyrics are all in Swedish.  This is the second of a planned four-album concept series based on the elements, the first being Jordpuls.

Track listing

Personnel

Vintersorg
Andreas Hedlund  - vocals, guitars (acoustic, lead, rhythm), bass, keyboards, programming 
Mattias Marklund - guitars (lead, rhythm)

Guest musicians and staff
 Cia Hedmark - female vocals on "Norrskenssyner"
 Kris Verwimp - cover art, booklet
 Orjan Fredriksson - photography
 Produced, engineered, mastered and mixed by Vintersorg

References

Vintersorg albums
2012 albums
Napalm Records albums